Dibeng is a town in John Taolo Gaetsewe District Municipality in the Northern Cape province of South Africa, situated on the banks of the dry Gamagara River. The name is Tswana in origin, from deben, and means "first drinking place". Deben is a variant spelling.

See also
 :af:NG gemeente Deben

References

Populated places in the Gamagara Local Municipality